The year 1962 in radio involved some significant events.


Events
May 19 – XHDL-FM begins broadcasting on 98.5 FM in Mexico City under the name XELA-FM. 
 July – After its first few months on the air with a community format, KHAK (98.1 FM) in Cedar Rapids, Iowa, takes up a country music format at the station, a format that has remained intact to this day.
July 1 – KRSI-FM in St. Louis Park, Minnesota, signs on the air as KRSI-FM.
October 2 – KUAC, Fairbanks, first FM Station, begins broadcasting at 104.7, with the morning Show AM on October 3.
 December – KLOU 103.3 in St. Louis, Missouri, begins broadcasting as KMOX-FM.

No dates
In Sweden, Sveriges Radio begins trial broadcasts in preparation for the establishment of a third national channel – P3 – as an alternative to commercial pirate radio.
KRZY in Dallas, Texas, becomes KPCN and flips to a country music format.

Debuts
October 13 – Svensktoppen, a weekly record chart, is launched by Sveriges Radio. 
Bud Ballou begins his radio career as disc jockey at WOLF.

Closings
February 1 - My True Story ends its run on network radio (Mutual). 
September 30 – CBS broadcasts the final episodes of Suspense and Yours Truly, Johnny Dollar, marking what some consider the end of the Golden Age of Radio.

Births
September 20 – Jim Al-Khalili, Iraqi-born British science broadcaster
October 12 – Chris Botti, American jazz trumpeter, composer and radio host
October 28 – Dan "Elvis" Lay, American radio personality, co-host of The Dog House
November 6 – Frank DeCaro, American writer, performer and SIRIUS OutQ radio show host
November 22 – Steve DeOssie, American sportscaster, former NFL player
December 12 – Mike Golic, American football player and radio host

Deaths
 February 17 – Joseph Kearns, 55, American radio and television actor
 October 2 – Frank Lovejoy, 50, American radio and television actor
 December 7 – Kirsten Flagstad, 67, Norwegian soprano whose nationwide personal appeals to radio listeners during Saturday matinee intermissions raised money for the Metropolitan Opera.
 December 31 – Bella Alten, 85, Polish-born operatic soprano who gave concerts and radio broadcasts until 1936

References

 
Radio by year